Tianzhu is the historical Chinese name for India, Originally pronounced as  l̥induk or *qʰl'iːn  tuɡ 天竺 in Old Chinese, it comes from the Chinese transliteration of unattested Old Persian diminutive *Hinduka-, which is from attested 𐏃𐎡𐎯𐎢𐏁 h-i-du-u-š (Hindu), which is itself derived from the Proto-Indo-Iranian *síndʰuš, the etymon also of Sanskrit Sindhu, the native name of the Indus River. Persians travelling in northwest India named the region after the river around the 6th century BC. Tianzhu is just one of several Chinese transliterations of Sindhu.  Yuāndú ( OC n̥i[ŋ][d]ˤuk) appears in Sima Qian's Records of the Grand Historian and Tiandu is used in the Book of the Later Han. Yintejia comes from the Kuchean Indaka, another transliteration of Hindu. A detailed account of Tianzhu is given in the "Xiyu Zhuan" (Record of the Western Regions) in the Hou Hanshu compiled by Fan Ye (398–445):

Tianzhu was also referred to as Wutianzhu (literal meaning is "Five Indias"), because there were five geographical regions in India known to the Chinese: Central, Eastern, Western, Northern, and Southern India.

In Japan, Tianzhu was pronounced as Tenjiku. It is used in such works as the Japanese translation of Journey to the West.

In Korea, Tianzhu was pronounced as Cheonchuk. It is used in Wang ocheonchukguk jeon (An Account of Travel to the Five Indian Kingdoms), a travelogue by the 8th century Buddhist monk Hyecho from the Korean Kingdom of Silla.

See also
 Names for India
 Indus Valley civilisation
 Tianzhu (Chinese name of Godzilla)

References

Japanese historical terms
Historical Chinese exonyms
History of the foreign relations of Japan
History of the foreign relations of China
Names of places in Asia
History of India
Toponyms for India